Eadwine was Abbot of Abingdon.

Eadwine was the brother of Ealdorman Ælfric of Hampshire, who purchased the abbacy for him in 985; he died in 990.

References 
 Kelly, S. E. 2000. Charters of Abingdon, part 1. Anglo-Saxon Charters 7.

External links 
 

Abbots of Abingdon
990 deaths
Year of birth unknown